Douglas Glacier is a glacier that flows east-northeast through the central Werner Mountains in Palmer Land. The glacier merges with Bryan Glacier just north of Mount Broome where it enters New Bedford Inlet. It was mapped by the United States Geological Survey from ground surveys and U.S. Navy air photos, 1961–67, and was named by the Advisory Committee on Antarctic Names for Everett L. Douglas, a biologist at Palmer Station, summer 1967–68.

References 

Glaciers of Palmer Land